A Serious Game is a 2016 Swedish romantic drama film directed by Pernilla August, based on the novel The Serious Game by Hjalmar Söderberg.

Plot
Arvid Stjärnblom, an aspiring journalist from Värmland, working as a proofreader for a daily newspaper in Stockholm, falls head over heels in love with Lydia Stille, a painter's daughter. With his low income, he doesn't think he could provide Lydia with an appropriate lifestyle. Rather than waiting for him, she chooses to marry the wealthy but much older landowner Markus Roslin. Years later, Arvid is married as well, and both couples have a daughter. When Arvid and Lydia see each other again, neither can overcome their mutual attraction. They begin a passionate affair, which greatly afflicts their loved ones, leading to dramatic events.

Cast
 Sverrir Gudnason as Arvid Stjärnblom
Karin Franz Körlof as Lydia Stille
Michael Nyqvist as chief editor Markel
 Mikkel Følsgaard as Carl Lidner
 Liv Mjönes as Dagmar Stjärnblom, née Randel
 Göran Ragnerstam as Anders Stille
 Sven Nordin as Markus Roslin
 Staffan Göthe as Arvid's father
 Alva Hellenius as Marianne
 Liva Östervall as Anne Marie

References

External links
 
 

2010s historical drama films
2010s historical romance films
2016 romantic drama films
2016 films
Adultery in films
Films based on Swedish novels
Films set in the 1910s
Films shot in Budapest
Swedish historical drama films
2010s Swedish-language films
Swedish romantic drama films
2010s Swedish films